The 2008 United States Senate election in Iowa was held on November 4, 2008. Incumbent Democratic U.S. Senator Tom Harkin sought re-election to a fifth term in office. Unlike Harkin's three previous reelection bids, he was not challenged by a sitting United States Congressman but instead faced small businessman Christopher Reed, who won the Republican primary by just a few hundred votes. Harkin defeated Reed in a landslide, winning 94 of Iowa's 99 counties. , this is the last time that a Democrat has won a U.S. Senate election in Iowa.

Democratic primary

Candidates 
 Tom Harkin, incumbent U.S. Senator

Results

Republican primary

Candidates 
 George Eichhorn, former Iowa State Representative
 Steve Rathje, construction company executive
 Christopher Reed, small businessman

Results

General election

Predictions

Polling

Results

See also 
 2008 United States Senate elections

References 

2008
Iowa
United States Senate